Himeyn Dhuniye is a 2000 Maldivian drama film directed by Abdul Faththaah. Produced by Ismail Naseer, Moosa Latheef under Dhekedhekeves Productions, the film stars Ali Khalid and Mariyam Nisha in lead roles.

Premise
Ahmed (Ali Khalid), a womanizer, has an extra-marital affair with his colleague, Sofi (Mariyam Nisha) who is dealing with her recent breakup with a drug addict, Imthiyaz. Ahmed, being disloyal to his patient wife, Shaheedha (Aminath Rasheedha) is involved with another woman, a widow, Nahidha (Mariyam Shakeela) while Sofi mistreats her own mother (Fauziyya Hassan).

Cast 
 Mariyam Nisha as Sofi
 Ali Khalid as Ahmed
 Moosa Zakariyya as Shamil
 Sajna Ahmed as Suzi
 Aminath Rasheedha as Shaheedha
 Mariyam Shakeela as Nahidha
 Ashraf Numaan as Imthiyaz
 Fauziyya Hassan as Sofi's mother
 Zuleykha Abdul Latheef as Maisara
 Aminath Ibrahim Didi as Shamil's mother
 Ismail Zahir
 Koyya Hassan Manik as Shamil's stepfather (Special appearance)
 Ismail Hilmy as Maisara's husband (Special appearance)
 Hussain Nooradeen as a Taxi Driver (Special appearance)

Soundtrack

References

2000 films
2000 drama films
Maldivian drama films
Films directed by Abdul Faththaah
Dhivehi-language films